Kinneil may refer to:

Kinneil House, a historic house near Bo'ness, Scotland
Kinneil railway station, in Bo'ness
The Bo'ness and Kinneil Railway
SS Telefon, a Norwegian cargo ship renamed SS Kinneil under British ownership